Joaquina Kalukango is an American actor and singer best known for playing Nelly O'Brien in the Broadway musical Paradise Square, for which she won the 2022 Tony Award for Best Actress in a Musical. She was nominated for Best Actress in a Play in 2020 for portraying Kaneisha in Slave Play.  In addition to her theatre work, Kalukango has appeared in One Night in Miami and When They See Us.

Early life
Kalukango was born in Atlanta, Georgia, and graduated from the Juilliard School. Kalukango is of Angolan descent, and her parents arrived in the United States as political refugees.  Due to her heritage, Kalukango wants to work on roles that showcase the Black experience.

Theatre credits

Awards and nominations

References

External links 
 
 
 

Living people
African-American actresses
American stage actresses
American television actresses
American musical theatre actresses
21st-century American actresses
21st-century African-American women
Year of birth missing (living people)
American people of Angolan descent
Tony Award winners
Drama Desk Award winners